Mykola Hryhorovych Malomuzh (born September 23, 1955, in Zvenyhorodka Raion, Cherkasy Oblast) is a Ukrainian politician, General of the army of Ukraine. Malomuzh served as Head of the Foreign Intelligence Service of Ukraine (2005–2010) and was Adviser to the President of Ukraine (2010–2014).

In the 2014 Ukrainian presidential election Malomuzh received 0.13% of the vote.

References

External links
 Foreign Intelligence Service of Ukraine

1955 births
Living people
People from Cherkasy Oblast
University of Kyiv, Law faculty alumni
Generals of the Army (Ukraine)
People of the Foreign Intelligence Service of Ukraine
Candidates in the 2014 Ukrainian presidential election